The Harpswell Meetinghouse is a historic colonial meeting house on Maine State Route 123 in Harpswell, Maine.  Built in 1757-59 to provide space for both religious services and town meetings, it is a little-altered and well-preserved example of a once-common form, and is the oldest such surviving building in the state of Maine.  It was designated a National Historic Landmark in 1968.

Description and history
It is a two-story wood frame structure, set on a rubble stone foundation, with clapboard siding and a side gable roof.

The interior of the meetinghouse is a single large chamber with a gallery level on three sides.  The fourth side, one of the long walls has the pulpit at its center, opposite the entrance.  This arrangement was typical in New England meetinghouses until the early 19th century.  Also typical of the period are the soffits and sounding board which frame the pulpit area.  The walls are finished with wooden wainscoting and plaster over lath.  The building was originally filled with box pews, but these were removed in the 19th century.

The Harpswell parish was organized in 1751, when the area was still part of Yarmouth.  Its first minister was the Reverend Elisha Eaton, was appointed in 1753.  Construction of the meeting house was begun in 1757, a job in which Eaton's son, also named Elisha, assisted, providing sashes and frames.  The building was not ready for use until 1759, and was still reported to be unfinished in 1774.  It served as both a religious and civic meeting space until 1844, and then stood vacant for 14 years before the town adapted for its exclusive use.  It was used to house town offices, and as a polling place.  In 1958 a painstaking restoration was begun, replacing plaster with carefully color-matched replacements, and custom-building windows to match the originals.

The meetinghouse was designated a National Historic Landmark and was listed on the National Register of Historic Places in 1968.

See also

List of National Historic Landmarks in Maine
National Register of Historic Places listings in Cumberland County, Maine

References

External links

Religious buildings and structures completed in 1757
Town halls in Maine
National Historic Landmarks in Maine
Churches on the National Register of Historic Places in Maine
City and town halls on the National Register of Historic Places in Maine
Churches in Cumberland County, Maine
Buildings and structures in Harpswell, Maine
Historic American Buildings Survey in Maine
National Register of Historic Places in Cumberland County, Maine
18th-century churches in the United States